May House may refer to:

Hong Kong, China
 May House, one of the skyscrapers part of the Hong Kong Police Headquarters

United States

 May-Stringer House, Brooksville, Florida,  listed on the National Register of Historic Places (NRHP)
 Asa May House (Capps, Florida), NRHP-listed
 Robert May House, Anchorage, Kentucky, listed on the NRHP in Anchorage, Kentucky
 David L. May House, Elizabethtown, Kentucky, listed on the NRHP in Hardin County, Kentucky
 Samuel May House, Prestonsburg, Kentucky, NRHP-listed
 Sophie May House, Norridgewock, Maine, listed on the NRHP in Somerset County, Maine
 Meyer May House, Grand Rapids, Michigan, NRHP-listed
 Dr. H. A. May House, Washington, Missouri, listed on the NRHP in Franklin County, Missouri
 Albert May House, Stevensville, Montana, NRHP-listed
 Rundlet-May House, Portsmouth, New Hampshire, NRHP-listed
 David and Mary May House, Cincinnati, Ohio, NRHP-listed
 Asa May House (West Fairlee, Vermont), listed on the NRHP in Orange County, Vermont
 Eli May House, Fort Atkinson, Wisconsin, listed on the NRHP in Jefferson County, Wisconsin